, better known as , is a Japanese mixed martial artist, professional wrestler and former kickboxer. A professional MMA competitor from 1991 until 2013, he fought the majority of his career in Fighting Network RINGS. Once a student of legendary professional wrestlers Satoru Sayama and Akira Maeda, Nagai holds notable victories over Yoshihisa Yamamoto, former King of Pancrase Super Heavyweight Champion Tsuyoshi Kosaka, Nobuaki Kakuda, four-time world kickboxing champion Andre Mannaart, RINGS King of Kings 2000 Tournament runner up Valentijn Overeem, ADCC bronze medallist and RINGS Light Heavyweight title contender Chris Haseman, and Pancrase veteran Takaku Fuke. He also fought for K-1 in kickboxing.
 
He later transitioned to traditional puroresu and notably wrestled for Battlarts, New Japan Pro-Wrestling (NJPW) and All Japan Pro Wrestling (AJPW), where he is a former three time All Asia Tag Team Champion. He currently performs on a part-time basis and has competed for shoot style and MMA promotion GLEAT and Pro Wrestling Noah.

Mixed martial arts career
Hirokazu trained in Satoru Sayama's Super Tiger Gym during secondary school and tried to join All Japan Pro Wrestling immediately afterwards, but its chairman Giant Baba asked him to finish high school first. While studying, Nagai started competing in amateur shootboxing and amassed a 5–2 record, which made him change his ambition, so after graduating he went to join UWF Newborn instead of AJPW. He became a trainee under Akira Maeda, training in the shoot wrestling style, but he got injured and UWF closed his doors before he could debut. Nagai eventually followed Maeda to his new promotion, Fighting Network RINGS.

Fighting Network RINGS (1991–1997)
Nagai debuted in RINGS on August 1, 1991 in a match against Herman Renting. He revealed himself as a promising rookie, showing will and toughness, but aside of a high-profile shoot match against Gerard Gordeau on December 7, in which he was defeated in 0:34, Nagai was relegated to low profile matches. He qualified for the Mega Battle Tournament 1991, but was eliminated on the first round by Masaaki Satake. During his time at RINGS, Nagai competed in shoot style wrestling, mixed rules shoot contests and mixed martial arts fights. He competed in a number of shoot contests during the early years of RINGS where he was defeated by Dick Vrij on May 16, 1992 by TKO, and would also lose to Willie Peeters on July 16, 1992, however he got notable KO victories against Koichiro Kimura and Nobuhiro Tsurumaki, and a decision win against Nobuaki Kakuda.

In 1994, Nagai looked to ascend the scale by taking part on the Mega Battle Tournament 1994, eliminating Ameran Bitsadze on the first round, but then losing to Chris Dolman in the second. By 1995, RINGS was transitioning into a mixed martial arts promotion, and he faced Dick Vrij in a shoot rematch held in RINGS Holland on February 19, 1995, but he fell knocked by a knee strike while Vrij was illegally holding the ropes in the corner, an action which went unnoticed or the referee, and the decision was not overturned. However, Mitsuya would get booked for a trend of victories back in Japan, beating the likes of Andrei Kopylov, Yoshihisa Yamamoto and Carl Greco. He finally would get his retribution over Vrij submitting him via heel hook in an MMA fight on August 24, 1996. Nagai then fought Tsuyoshi Kohsaka, overwhelming the judoka with kicks, palm strikes, body punches and knees while Kohsaka fended off the strikes with takedowns and submission attempts. However, when the fight was brought back to standing Nagai beat him with knees, earning a TKO victory and one of the biggest wins of his RINGS career. He then got another MMA victory against Willie Peeters, winning via heel hook, but his momentum got cut short by a submission loss to Kiyoshi Tamura at the Mega Battle Tournament 1996. In 1997, Nagai competed in several MMA fights, losing his first three, with two of those losses coming via mismatched contests against heavyweight fighter Joop Kasteel. He then got notable wins against Valentijn Overeem, Andre Mannaart and Chris Haseman, all by heel hook.

In 1997, Nagai got a license by the All Japan Kickboxing Federation and competed at the Kick Over IX event as a RINGS representative. It would be his last year in the promotion, as he left RINGS after a match with Akira Maeda in which Maeda shot on him after the bell, although it is possible it could have been a worked shoot.

Kickboxing and later MMA career (1997-2013)
After leaving RINGS Nagai briefly pursued a career in kickboxing, and fought in K-1 between 1997 and 1999. His kickboxing career was unsuccessful, and he retired with a record of 6 losses and 1 draw in August 1999. On March 2013, Nagai returned to MMA after 15 years away from the sport, beating Takaku Fuke by ankle lock in the first round at a U-SPIRITS event.

Professional wrestling career

Battlarts (1999–2000)
Nagai turned his hand to professional wrestling and joined Yuki Ishikawa's shoot style promotion Battlarts. His run was somewhat successful, with Nagai earning victories over established wrestlers like Takeshi Ono, Yuki Ishikawa and Katsumi Usuda. In the 2000 Young Generation Battle, Nagai went undefeated for the entirety of the tournament, beating Usuda, Mohammed Yone, Mach Junji, Rastaman and Minoru Tanaka to reach the final, where he lost to Alexander Otsuka. After Battlarts went on hiatus beginning in November 2000, Nagai and the rest of the roster were forced to leave the promotion.

All Japan Pro Wrestling (2001–2005) 

Almost immediately after Battlarts began its hiatus, Nagai was announced for the 2000 Real World Tag League in All Japan Pro Wrestling (AJPW), the promotion he had originally hoped to join in high school. Nagai was paired up with fellow UWF alumnus Masahito Kakihara, calling themselves "Team Strongs". Despite the name, Team Strongs performed poorly in the tag league, earning just two points with a win over Barry Windham and Kendall Windham. In only his second match, Nagai lost to AJPW's top star Toshiaki Kawada, and, even though he lost, he earned Kawada's respect and was selected to be his new tag partner. As a newcomer, Nagai was required to prove himself before he entered the 2001 Champion Carnival, and thus was put into the Champion Carnival Qualifying League. Nagai excelled in the qualification league which granted him entry to the Champion Carnival where he struggled, again earning just one win and two points. Despite mixed success and his newcomer status, Nagai was pushed as an All Japan loyalist and represented the company in interpromotional matches during AJPW's working relationship with New Japan Pro-Wrestling (NJPW).

On June 6, 2001, Nagai was involved in an incident during a match against NJPW wrestler Takashi Iizuka at an NJPW show, where Nagai delivered a kick to Iizuka's face which resulted in Iizuka being severely concussed and needing over a year off to recover. Two days later when the NJPW roster came to the AJPW show in Nippon Budokan, Nagai and Kakihara beat NJPW's Yuji Nagata and Shinya Makabe to win the vacant All Asia Tag Team Championship, however, their reign was cut short after Kakihara suffered a knee injury and eventually left All Japan for NJPW after he had recovered, effectively breaking up Team Strongs. Nevertheless, Nagai's position as a loyalist in the post-exodus era All Japan continued to rise, and he teamed with Toshiaki Kawada in a loss to TenCozy (Hiroyoshi Tenzan and Satoshi Kojima) on September 16 on an NJPW card. Nagai teamed up with Kawada again for the 2001 Real World Tag League, seeing much greater success than the previous year, earning 10 points and making it to the final where they lost to Keiji Mutoh and Taiyo Kea. In early 2002, he entered the Giant Baba Memorial Cup, a tournament focused on young wrestlers where he dominated, earning 24 points and beating Nobutaka Araya in the final to win the tournament. Not long after winning, he entered the 2002 Champion Carnival and performed respectably, earning 6 points but failing to reach the final. In what would be his final tour with All Japan, Nagai partnered with Yoji Anjo for the 2002 Real World Tag League, earning 4 points and failing to reach the final.

After 2 years with the promotion, Nagai left All Japan in December 2002.

New Japan Pro-Wrestling (2003–2005)

Makai Club (2003–2004) 
Immediately after leaving AJPW, Nagai was signed by New Japan Pro-Wrestling (NJPW), whom he had previously worked for during the inter-promotional relationship between both promotions. Due to his background in kickboxing and Rings, Nagai was placed into the Makai Club, a group of wrestlers with legitimate backgrounds in martial arts. Nagai debuted under a mask as Makai #5 at Wrestling World 2003, teaming with the returning Katsuyori Shibata, who was now masked and competing as Makai #4. In their debut as a team, the two defeated Nagai's former partner Masahito Kakihara and Takashi Iizuka. After defeating Kakihara in singles action at Ryogoku Kokugikan in February, Makai #5 voluntarily unmasked himself as Nagai, though he continued to compete as both himself and Makai #5 after this. In July, Makai #5 and #4, who had dubbed themselves , challenged for the IWGP Tag Team Championship, losing to reigning champions Hiroshi Tanahashi and Yutaka Yoshie in Osaka. Nagai competed at Wrestling World 2004, teaming with Makai #1, Ryushi Yanagisawa and Ryota Chikuzen to defeat the Crazy Dogs (Enson Inoue, Hiro Saito, Michiyoshi Ohara and Tatsutoshi Goto). Nagai would compete twice at NJPW's King of Sports pay-per-view in March, first teaming with Shibata, #1 and Yanagisawa to defeat Blue Wolf, Shinya Makabe, Toru Yano and Yutaka Yoshie, but later losing to Josh Barnett in a singles match.

Face turn and team with Naruse (2004–2006) 

After the Makai Club broke up in the summer of 2004, Nagai began a face turn, returning to AJPW for one night only on July 22 where he lost to his mentor Toshiaki Kawada. It was also during this time that he aligned himself with fellow Rings alumni Masayuki Naruse, with the two unsuccessfully challenging Genichiro Tenryu and Masanobu Fuchi for the All Asia Tag Team Championship on July 26. Around this time, Nagai joined Black New Japan while keeping his team with Naruse, which caused friction between them. On November 3 at Masahiro Chono's 20th Anniversary Show, they challenged once again, this time beating Fuchi and Tenryu to win the titles. He also returned to AJPW in December, teaming with Kawada for the Real World Tag League. They made it to the playoffs, where a loss to a RO&D (Jamal and Taiyo Kea) stopped them from reaching the final. After dropping the All Asia belts in February, Nagai suffered an injury competing against Naruse in March which would keep him out of action for the rest of 2005. In January 2006, Nagai was one of a number of New Japan wrestlers who opted not to renew their contracts with the promotion and became a freelancer.

Freelancing (2006–present) 

After leaving New Japan, Nagai debuted for Dramatic Dream Team (DDT), choosing a lighter schedule in a comedy promotion which would allow his injury to heal at a quicker rate. He aligned himself with Poison Sawada Julie's Serpent Council in late 2006, and also began competing for Tatsumi Fujinami's Muga World Pro Wrestling around this time. It was in MUGA Nagai would find his new home, competing regularly for the next few years while also making occasional appearances in DDT and various shoot style promotions such as Battlarts and Daisuke Ikeda's Fu-Ten. In February 2009, he wrestled Canadian wrestler Test in what would be Test's last match before he died the following month.

In September 2010, he beat Alexander Otsuka to win Real Japan Pro Wrestling (RJPW)'s Legend Championship. He held the title for nearly a year before dropping it to Super Tiger in July 2011. Nagai won it back from Tiger in March 2012, and again dropped it to Tiger in December. In January 2014, Nagai's appearances in Dradition became more sporadic, and he instead became a regular in All Japan Pro Wrestling (AJPW) once again, forming the Dark Kingdom stable with Kenso, which would later add Black Tiger VII, Black Tiger and Takeshi Minamino to its ranks. As Dark Kingdom, Nagai and Minamino won the All Asia Tag Team Championship in January 2015. They dropped the titles to Ultimo Dragon and Yoshinobu Kanemaru in March.

Nagai would later debut and make Pro Wrestling Noah his home in late 2017, entering the 2017 Global League where a loss to Naomichi Marufuji stopped him from reaching the final.

Fighting style
As a fighter, Nagai utilized his shootboxing background and made use of precise kicks, knees and body punches before engaging in clinch fighting. Owing to his shoot wrestling influence, he showed excellent knowledge of leglocks and often used single and double-leg takedown attempts to transition into leglock battles, notably winning several fights by heel hook. As he wasn't the strongest fighter in RINGS, he operated an efficient bottom grappling game centered around his flexibility and ability to transition to submission attempts from unlikely positions.

Championships and accomplishments
All Japan Pro Wrestling
All Asia Tag Team Championship (3 times) - with Masahito Kakihara (1), Masayuki Naruse (1), and Takeshi Minamino (1)
Giant Baba Memorial Cup (2002)
Chō Sentō Puroresu FMW
FMW World Street Fight 8-Man Tag Team Championship (1 time, current) – with Black Tiger V, Black Tiger VII and Tiger Mask III Tigre en Mascarado
Muga World Pro Wrestling
Muga Premium Tournament (2006)
Real Japan Pro Wrestling
Legend Championship (2 times)

Mixed martial arts record

|-
| Win
| align=center| 18-8
| Takaku Fuke
| Submission (ankle lock)
| U-Spirits - Again
| 
| align=center| 1
| align=center| 8:46
| Tokyo, Japan
|-
| Loss
| align=center| 17-8
| Akira Maeda
| N/A
| Rings - Mega Battle Tournament 1997 Final
| 
| align=center| N/A
| align=center| N/A
| Tokyo, Japan
| 
|-
| Win
| align=center| 17-7
| Chris Haseman
| Submission (heel hook)
| Rings - Mega Battle Tournament 1997 Semifinal 1
| 
| align=center| 1
| align=center| 9:18
| Tokyo, Japan
| 
|-
| Win
|align=center| 16–7
| Mikhail Simov
| Submission (kneebar)
| Rings - Rings Fighting Extension 6
| 
|align=center| 1
|align=center| 6:38
| Kagoshima, Japan
|
|-
| Loss
| align=center| 15-7
| Yoshihisa Yamamoto
| Submission (armbar)
| Rings - Fighting Extension 5
| 
| align=center| 1
| align=center| 2:27
| Tokyo, Japan
|-
| Win
|align=center| 15-6
| Andre Mannaart
| Submission (heel hook)
| Rings - Fighting Extension 4
| 
|align=center| 1
|align=center| 0:20
| Tokyo, Japan
|
|-
| Win
| align=center| 14-6
| Valentijn Overeem
| Submission (heel hook)
| Rings - Fighting Extension 3
| 
| align=center| 1
| align=center| 4:58
| Sendai, Japan
| 
|-
| Loss
| align=center| 13-6
| Joop Kasteel
| TKO (lost points)
| Rings - Extension Fighting 2
| 
| align=center| 1
| align=center| 6:27
| Osaka, Japan
| 
|-
| Loss
| align=center| 13-5
| Joop Kasteel
| KO (punches)
|  Rings Holland - The Final Challenge
|  
| align=center| 1
| align=center| 5:12
| Amsterdam, Netherlands
| 
|-
| Loss
| align=center| 13-4
| Nikolai Zouev
| Submission (ankle lock)
| Rings - Budokan Hall 1997
| 
| align=center| 1
| align=center| 13:01
| Tokyo, Japan
| 
|-
| Loss
| align=center|  13-3
| Kiyoshi Tamura
| Submission (scarf hold armlock)
| Rings - Battle Dimensions Tournament 1996 Final
| 
| align=center| 1
| align=center| 6:13
| Osaka, Japan
| 
|-
| Win
| align=center| 13-2
| Willie Peeters
| Submission (heel hook)
| Rings - Battle Dimensions Tournament 1996 Opening Round
| 
| align=center| 1
| align=center| 9:36
| Tokyo, Japan
| 
|-
| Win
| align=center| 12-2
| Tsuyoshi Kosaka
| TKO (knees)
| Rings - Maelstrom 7
| 
| align=center| 1
| align=center| 11:05
| Sapporo, Japan
|
|-
| Win
| align=center| 12-2
| Dick Vrij
| Submission (heel hook)
| Rings - Maelstrom 6
| 
| align=center| 1
| align=center| 6:16
| Tokyo, Japan
| 
|-
| Loss
| align=center| 10-2
| Volk Han
| Submission (rear naked choke)
| Rings - Maelstrom 4
| 
| align=center| 1
| align=center| 11:47
| Tokyo, Japan
| 
|-
| Win
|align=center| 10-1
| Glenn Brown
| Submission (rear naked choke)
| Rings - Maelstrom 2
| 
|align=center| 1
|align=center| 0:40
| Osaka, Japan
|
|-
| Win
|align=center| 9-1
| Mikhail Ilyukhin
| KO (palm strike)
| Rings - Maelstrom 1
| 
|align=center| 1
|align=center| 11:24
| Niigata, Japan
|
|-
| Win
| align=center| 8-1
| Ruud Ewoldt
| TKO (retirement)
| Rings Holland - Kings of Martial Arts
| 
| align=center| 2
| align=center| 2:12
| Amsterdam, Netherlands
| 
|-
| Win
| align=center| 7-1
| Tony Halme
| Submission (kneebar)
| Rings - Budokan Hall 1996
| 
| align=center| 1
| align=center| 8:58
| Tokyo, Japan
|-
| Win
| align=center| 6-1
| Nikolai Zouev
| Submission (guillotine choke)
| Rings - Mega Battle Tournament 1995
| 
| align=center| 1
| align=center| 14:04
| Osaka, Japan
|-
| Win
| align=center| 5-1
| Bakouri Gogitidze
| Submission (kneebar)
| Rings - Battle Dimensions Tournament 1995 Opening Round
| 
| align=center| 1
| align=center| 6:38
| Tokyo, Japan
| 
|-
| Win
|align=center| 4–1
| Peter Oele
| Submission (ankle lock)
| Rings Rising Series - Nagatsuki
| 
|align=center| 1
|align=center| 7:42
| Sapporo, Japan
|
|-
| Win
|align=center| 3–1
| Willie Peeters
| Submission (rear naked choke)
| Rings Rising Series - Uzuki
| 
|align=center| 1
|align=center| 5:34
| Osaka, Japan
|
|-
| Win
|align=center| 2–1
| Yoshihisa Yamamoto
| Submission (achilles lock)
| Rings Rising Series - Yayoi
| 
|align=center| 1
|align=center| 17:18
| Tokyo, Japan
|-
| Loss
| align=center| 1-1
| Dick Vrij
| KO (knee)
| Rings Holland - Free Fight
| 
| align=center| 1
| align=center| 3:07
| Amsterdam, Netherlands
| 
|-
| Win
| align=center| 1-0
| Mark Ashford
| TKO (kicks)
| Rings - Budokan Hall 1995
| 
| align=center| 1
| align=center| 8:11
| Tokyo, Japan
|

Mixed rules 

|  Draw
|align=center| 6–4-1
| Vladimir Klementiev
| Draw
| Rings Megaton Fight 1994
| 
|align=center| 6
|align=center| 18:00
| Tokyo, Japan
|-
| Win
|align=center| 6–4
| Mikhail Simov
| Submission
| Rings Korakuen Experimental League 1993 Round 6
| 
|align=center| 3
|align=center| 1:32
| Tokyo, Japan
|-
| Win
|align=center| 5–4
| Yoshinori Nishi
| Decision (unanimous)
| Rings Korakuen Experimental League 1993 Round 3
| 
|align=center| 5
|align=center| 15:00
| Tokyo, Japan
|-
| Win
|align=center| 4–4
| Nobuhiro Tsurumaki
| KO (knees)
| Rings Korakuen Experimental League 1993 Round 2
| 
|align=center| 2
|align=center| 0:37
| Tokyo, Japan
|
|-
| Win
|align=center| 3–4
| Sandor Telgen
| Submission (toe hold)
| Rings Korakuen Experimental League 1993 Round 1
| 
|align=center| 1
|align=center| 5:27
| Tokyo, Japan
|-
| Loss
|align=center| 2-4
| Masaaki Satake
| KO (palm strike)
| Rings - Mega Battle Tournament 1992 First Round
| 
|align=center| 1
|align=center| 1:24
| Nagoya, Japan
| 
|-
| Loss
|align=center| 2–3
| Willie Peeters
| Decision (unanimous)
| Rings - Mega Battle VI
| 
|align=center| 5
|align=center| 15:00
| Osaka, Japan
|
|-
| Win
|align=center| 2-2
| Nobuaki Kakuda
| Decision (unanimous)
| Rings Mega Battle 5th - Shishiku
| 
|align=center| 5
|align=center| 15:00
| Sendai, Japan
|
|-
| Loss
|align=center| 1–2
| Dick Vrij
| TKO (palm strike)
| Rings - Mega Battle IV
| 
|align=center| 1
|align=center| 6:11
| Tokyo, Japan
| 
|-
| Win
|align=center| 1-1
| Koichiro Kimura
| KO (palm strikes and knees)
| Rings Mega Battle 1st - Kaiten
| 
|align=center| 1
|align=center| 28:05
| Urayasu, Japan
|-
| Loss
|align=center| 0-1
| Gerard Gordeau
| TKO
| Rings Astral Step Final - Blaze Up
| 
|align=center| 4
|align=center| 0:34
| Tokyo, Japan

Kickboxing record

|-
|
|Loss
| Musashi
|K-1 Spirits '99
|Tokyo, Japan
|KO (left mid kick)
|1
|3:00
|0-6-1
|-
|
|Loss
|Ryuji Murakami
|K-1 Spirits '99
|Tokyo, Japan
|Decision (unanimous)
|2
|3:00
|0-5-1
|-
|
|Loss
|Andre Mannaart
|K-1 Rising '99
|Tokyo, Japan
|KO (right punch)
|2
|1:20
|0-4
|-
|
|Loss
|Jan Nortje
|K-1 Japan '98 Kamikaze
|Tokyo, Japan
|TKO (punch)
|1
|2:51
|0-3
|-
|
|Loss
|Tsuyoshi Nakasako
|K-1 Bushido '98
|Tokyo, Japan
|TKO (left high kick)
|2
|2:55
|0-2
|-
|
|Loss
|Reed
|Japan Kickboxing Federation - Kick Over IX
|Tokyo, Japan
|Decision (unanimous)
|3
|5:00
|0-1
|-
|-
| colspan=9 | Legend:

References

External links
 

1968 births
Living people
Japanese male mixed martial artists
Middleweight mixed martial artists
Mixed martial artists utilizing shootboxing
Mixed martial artists utilizing wrestling
Japanese male kickboxers
Japanese male professional wrestlers
Masked wrestlers
All Asia Tag Team Champions